Ryan Thomas Holte (born October 3, 1983) is a judge of the United States Court of Federal Claims.

Biography 

Holte graduated from Jesuit High School in Sacramento, California. Holte received his Bachelor of Engineering, magna cum laude, from the California State University Maritime Academy. He earned his Juris Doctor from the UC Davis School of Law, where he served as a staff editor of the UC Davis Business Law Journal.

Upon graduating from law school, Holte was a law clerk to Judge Loren A. Smith of the United States Court of Federal Claims and Judge Stanley F. Birch Jr. of the United States Court of Appeals for the Eleventh Circuit.

Before joining the law faculty at Akron, he served for four years on the faculty at Southern Illinois University School of Law, worked as a trial attorney at the United States Federal Trade Commission, and practiced law as an associate at Jones Day.
From 2017 to 2019 he served as the David L. Brennan Associate Professor of Law and the director of the Center for Intellectual Property Law and Technology at the University of Akron School of Law. He taught and researched in the areas of property and intellectual property law and is a recognized expert in these areas, completing numerous academic research fellowships and funded research grants. He also served as general counsel, partner, and co-inventor of an electrical engineering technology company.

Holte is co-inventor of US Patent 9,523,773, titled "System and methods for countering satellite-navigated munitions".

Federal judicial service 

On September 28, 2017, President Trump nominated Holte to serve as a judge of the United States Court of Federal Claims for a term of 15 years, to the seat vacated by Judge Nancy B. Firestone, who assumed senior status on October 22, 2013. On February 14, 2018, a hearing on his nomination was held before the Senate Judiciary Committee On March 15, 2018, his nomination was reported out of committee by a 14–7 vote. On January 3, 2019, his nomination was returned to the President under Rule XXXI, Paragraph 6 of the United States Senate. On January 23, 2019, President Trump announced his intent to renominate Holte for a federal judgeship. His nomination was sent to the Senate later that day. On February 7, 2019, his nomination was reported out of committee by a 15–7 vote.

On June 5, 2019, the Senate invoked cloture on his nomination by a 60–33 vote. On June 10, 2019, his nomination was confirmed by a 60–35 vote. He received his judicial commission on July 11, 2019. He took the oath of office on July 26, 2019.

Memberships 

He has been a member of the Federalist Society since 2005.

References

External links 
 
 

1983 births
Living people
21st-century American lawyers
21st-century American judges
California State University Maritime Academy alumni
Federal Trade Commission personnel
Federalist Society members
Illinois lawyers
Jones Day people
Judges of the United States Court of Federal Claims
Ohio lawyers
Ohio Republicans
People from Napa, California
Southern Illinois University faculty
UC Davis School of Law alumni
United States Article I federal judges appointed by Donald Trump
University of Akron faculty